Santa Barbara is a locality in the City of Gold Coast, Queensland, Australia. It is within the suburb of Hope Island.

History 
The Queensland Place Names Board named the town on 1 March 1968.

References 

City of Gold Coast
Towns in Queensland